Minoru Kamata (鎌田 實 Kamata Minoru, born June 28, 1948) is a Japanese physician, writer, and humanitarian. Throughout his medical career he has been an advocate of patient-centered care, and he has also been actively involved in international medical and humanitarian aid. As a founding member of the Japan Chernobyl Foundation, Kamata has been particularly active in promoting medical aid programs for victims of the Chernobyl disaster, and subsequently for victims of other international and domestic disasters and conflicts. His book Gambaranai, which became a best seller in Japan in 2000, was dramatized for Japanese television. Kamata has been the recipient of numerous awards for his contributions to medicine, publishing and broadcasting, as well as for his overseas aid work and peace efforts.

Life and work
Minoru Kamata was born in Suginami-ku, Tokyo, Japan, on June 28, 1948. Following graduation from Tokyo Metropolitan Nishi High School, he entered Tokyo Medical and Dental University. Upon completion of his medical studies in 1974, he joined the staff of Suwa Central Hospital in Chino, Nagano Prefecture, Japan, as a general practitioner, and in 1988 was appointed hospital director. Kamata has been a longtime advocate of community- and patient-centered health care, and of improved medical care for terminally ill patients.
In 1991, in the wake of the Chernobyl Nuclear Power Plant accident, he helped establish the Japan Chernobyl Foundation (JCF), a non-profit organization dedicated to providing medical care to children with leukemia, thyroid cancer, and other radiation-related illnesses. On behalf of JCF, Kamata has made numerous visits to the radioactive contamination zone in the Republic of Belarus to provide clinical aid and deliver medicine.

His book Gambaranai, a series of essays drawing on personal interactions with patients and their families, became a best seller in Japan, and the following year the book was adapted by the Tokyo Broadcasting System (TBS) as a television drama, starring Toshiyuki Nishida.

From 2003 to 2013, Kamata hosted a regular radio program on the NHK (or Japan Broadcasting Corporation) station NHK Radio 1. The program,  (Minoru Kamata’s Dialog about Life), featured conversations about doctor-patient interaction.

In 2004, through the then newly formed Japan Iraq Medical Network (JIM-NET), Kamata helped initiate Japanese medical support to Iraq. The group has provided medical supplies to five children's hospitals in Iraq, offered medical examinations in refugee camps, and contributed to the advancement of pediatric cancer research in the region.

Kamata was appointed Director Emeritus of the Suwa Central Hospital in 2005.

All profits from the sales of CDs have been used to support relief efforts in Iraq, Chernobyl, and the disaster-hit Tohoku region of Japan.

In 2010, after reading a newspaper article about the tragic shooting death of a young Palestinian boy, Kamata decided to write a book about the incident. The resulting Japanese-language work, has since been translated into English as Ahmed's Relay of Life, and also into Arabic and Hebrew. During subsequent travels to the Middle East, Kamata has reportedly handed out copies of the book in order to encourage discussions about peace.

Kamata has been the recipient of numerous honours and awards, including the Shinano Mainichi Shimbun Prize (1994), the Peace & Cooperative Journalist Fund Honorable Award (2000), the Order of Francysk Skaryna from the Republic of Belarus (2001), the Takashi Nagai Memorial Nagasaki Peace Award (2004), Yomiuri International Cooperation Prize (2006), the Best Father Yellow Ribbon Award (2009), the Japan Broadcasting Corporation Broadcast Culture Prize (2011), and the Cultural Award of Japan Broadcasting Corporation, NHK (2011).

In 2015 Kamata serves as chairman of the Japan Chernobyl Foundation (JCF), clinical professor at Tokyo Medical and Dental University School of Medicine, clinical professor at Tokai University School of Medicine, and official representative of the Japan-Iraq Medical Network (JIM-NET). He can also be heard weekly on the Nippon Cultural Broadcasting radio program , in which he continues to explore the ideas about community- and patient-centered health raised in his many published works.

Books
  (2000) 
  (2001) 
  (2003) 
  (2003) 
  (2004) 
 , (2004) 
  (2004) 
  (2005) 
  (2006) 
  (2006) 
  (2006) 
  (2006) 　
  (2007) 
  (2007) 
  (2007) 
  (2007) 　
  (2008) 
  (2008)　
  (2009) 
  (2009) 
  (2009) 
  (2010) 　
 　(2010) 
  (2010) 
  (2010) 
 　(2010) 
  (2011) 
  (2011) 
  (2011) 
  (2011) 
  (2012) 
 　(2013) 
  (2013) 
  (2013)

References

External links
 Minoru Kamata Official Website
 Japan Chernobyl Foundation Official Website
 English Page
 Japan Iraq Medical Network (JIM-NET) Official Website

Japanese general practitioners
Japanese non-fiction writers
1948 births
Tokyo Medical and Dental University alumni
Academic staff of Tokai University
People from Suginami
Living people
Japanese healthcare managers